The Chinese Flying pigeon is a breed of domestic pigeon. Chinese Flying pigeons, along with other varieties of domesticated pigeons, are all descendants from the rock pigeon (Columba livia).

Origin 
The Chinese Flying pigeon originated in China.

See also 
List of pigeon breeds

References

Pigeon breeds
Pigeon breeds originating in China